Long Fliv the King is a 1926 American silent comedy short film starring Charley Chase and featuring Oliver Hardy and Max Davidson in supporting roles. It is a remake of the 1920 Harold Lloyd film His Royal Slyness about a young man who accidentally becomes the king of a tiny country.

Cast
 Charley Chase as Charles Chase
 Martha Sleeper as Princess Helga of Thermosa
 Max Davidson as Warfield
 Oliver Hardy as The Prime Minister's Assistant
 Fred Malatesta as Hamir of Uvocado, the Prime Minister
 John Aasen as Giant Swordsman (uncredited)
 Sammy Brooks as (uncredited)
 Helen Gilmore as Helga's Lady-in-Waiting (uncredited)
 Lon Poff as (uncredited)

See also
 List of American films of 1926

External links

Still at silenthollywood.com

1926 films
1926 short films
American silent short films
American black-and-white films
Short film remakes
Silent American comedy films
American comedy short films
1926 comedy films
1920s American films